Sakshi Chaudhary, born in Dehradun, Uttarakhand, India is an Indian model and film actress. Sakshi primarily appears in Telugu movies, starting with Potugadu (2013).

Filmography

References

External links 

 
 

Living people
Actresses from Dehradun
Indian film actresses
Actresses in Telugu cinema
Actresses in Hindi cinema
21st-century Indian actresses
Actresses in Tamil cinema
Year of birth missing (living people)